Nomius is a genus of beetles in the family Carabidae, containing the following species:

 Nomius madagascariensis Basilewsky, 1967
 Nomius pygmaeus Dejean, 1831
 Nomius schoutedeni Basilewsky, 1954

References

Psydrinae
Carabidae genera